Layla Love is an American photographer based in New York. Her works generally focus on disadvantaged, exploited, and trafficked people.

Early life and education
Love was born in 1979 in Los Angeles, California. Growing up in California, Washington D.C., and Ireland, her childhood was characterized by continuous travel. As a child, Love was diagnosed with dystonia, a neurological movement disorder syndrome that required her to use wheelchairs and crutches in order to move. Aged 12, Love developed a fascination with photography.

Love studied at UC Santa Cruz and Richmond, The American International University in London.

Photography
At age 21, she ventured to war-torn areas with a focus on the plight of women and traveled to Chad, Cameroon, and Nigeria. Love's photography has been shown by Eric Franck Fine Arts at Paris Photo in Paris in 2011, and at the Association of International Photography Art Dealers (AiPAD) Photography Show in New York in 2009.

Exhibitions
Love has exhibited photography domestically across the United States as well as internationally.

2007 - Representing Woman – Unbreakable Surrealism solo exhibition, World Culture Open Center, New York City
2011 - Eric Franck Fine Art, New York City
2018 - Rise, Gallery Henoch, New York City

Books
She of God (2019) Co-authored with Emily Anne Gendron, Cardiff-by-the-sea, CA: Waterside Productions.

Philanthropy
Profits from her show Rise were promised to Voices for Freedom, Apne Aap, and CATW.

In 2016, Love, with Gloria Steinem, conceived of Rise of the Butterfly, to provide a sustainable source of funding for grassroots organizations working to fight human trafficking and help women and girls around the world recover from being trafficked.

References

External links
 Official website for Layla Love Art
 Rise of the Butterfly

1979 births
Living people
Photographers from Los Angeles
American women artists
Feminist artists
Artists from Los Angeles